The Cats is a jazz album released in December 1959 on New Jazz, a subsidiary label of Prestige Records. It is credited to pianist Tommy Flanagan, saxophonist John Coltrane, guitarist Kenny Burrell, and trumpeter Idrees Sulieman. It was issued after Coltrane's Prestige contract had ended.

Track listing 
All tracks written by Tommy Flanagan except where noted.
 "Minor Mishap" – 7:26
 "How Long Has This Been Going On?" (George and Ira Gershwin) – 5:58
 "Eclypso" – 7:57
 "Solacium" – 9:10
 "Tommy's Time" – 11:58

Personnel 
 Idrees Sulieman – trumpet
 John Coltrane – tenor saxophone
 Tommy Flanagan – piano - trio track 2
 Kenny Burrell – guitar 
 Doug Watkins – bass
 Louis Hayes – drums
On "How Long Has This Been Going On" Sulieman, Coltrane and Burrell do not play.

References 

---

1959 albums
John Coltrane albums
New Jazz Records albums
Tommy Flanagan albums
Albums produced by Bob Weinstock
Albums recorded at Van Gelder Studio